14 Herculis c or 14 Her c is an extrasolar planet approximately 58.5 light-years away in the constellation of Hercules.  The planet was found orbiting the star 14 Herculis, with a mass that would likely make the planet a gas giant roughly the same size as Jupiter but much more massive. It was discovered on November 17, 2005 and published on November 2, 2006, although its existence was not confirmed until 2021.

According to a 2007 analysis, the existence of a second planet in the 14 Herculis system was "clearly" supported by the evidence, but the planet's parameters were not precisely known. It may be in a 4:1 resonance with the inner planet 14 Herculis b.

The inclination and true mass of 14 Herculis c were measured in 2021, using data from Gaia.

References

External links 
 
 

Hercules (constellation)
Giant planets
Exoplanets discovered in 2005
Exoplanets detected by radial velocity
Exoplanets detected by astrometry